The Kingdom of France was organised into provinces until the National Constituent Assembly adopted a more uniform division into departments (départements) and districts in late 1789. The provinces continued to exist administratively until 21 September 1791.

The provinces of France were roughly equivalent to the historic counties of England. They came into their final form over the course of many hundreds of years, as many dozens of semi-independent fiefs and former independent countries came to be incorporated into the French royal domain. Because of the manner in which the provinces evolved, each had its own sets of feudal traditions, laws, taxation systems and courts; the system represented an impediment to effective administration of the entire country from Paris. During the early years of the French Revolution, in an attempt to centralise the administration of the whole country and to remove the influence of the French nobility over the country, the entirety of the province system was abolished and replaced by the system of departments in use today.

In some cases, several modern regions or departments share names with the historic provinces; their borders may cover roughly the same territory.

List of former provinces of France
The list below shows the major provinces of France at the time of their dissolution during the French Revolution. Capital cities are shown in parentheses. Bold indicates a city that was also the seat of a judicial and quasi-legislative body called either a parlement (not to be confused with a parliament) or a conseil souverain (sovereign council). In some cases, this body met in a different city from the capital.

 Île-de-France (Paris)
 Berry (Bourges)
 Orléanais (Orléans)
 Normandy (Rouen)
 Languedoc (Toulouse)
 Lyonnais (Lyon)
 Dauphiné (Grenoble)
 Champagne (Troyes)
 Aunis (La Rochelle)
 Saintonge (Saintes)
 Poitou (Poitiers)
 Guyenne and Gascony (Bordeaux)
 Burgundy (Dijon)
 Picardy (Amiens)
 Anjou (Angers)
 Provence (Aix-en-Provence)
 Angoumois (Angoulême)
 Bourbonnais (Moulins)
 Marche (Guéret)
 Brittany (Rennes)
 Maine (Le Mans)
 Touraine (Tours)
 Limousin (Limoges)
 Foix (Foix)
 Auvergne (Clermont-Ferrand)
 Béarn (Pau)
 Alsace (Strasbourg, conseils souverains in Colmar)
 Artois (Arras)
 Roussillon (Perpignan)
 Flanders and Hainaut (Lille, conseils souverains in Douai)
 Franche-Comté (Besançon)
 Lorraine and Barrois (Nancy); Trois-Évêchés (Three Bishoprics within Lorraine): Metz, Toul and Verdun
 Corsica (Ajaccio, conseils souverains in Bastia)
 Nivernais (Nevers)

Areas that were not part of the Kingdom of France, though they are currently parts of Metropolitan France:

Arms

Partial display of historical provincial arms:

References

Further reading
 Les Provinces de la France by le Vicomte Olivier de Romanet, la Nouvelle Librairie Nationale, 1913.
 Les Provinces au XVIIIe et leur division en départements de la France by Charles Berlet, Bloud, second edition, 1913.

See also
 Ancien Régime
 Gallery of French coats of arms
 Coat of arms
 Heraldry
 Royal Almanac

Subdivisions of France